Badhu Nuhen Mu Bandhu is a 2013 Indian Odia film directed by Sailendra Parida and starring newcomers Prabhas and Bidusmita.

Cast 
Prabhas 
Bidusmita 
Hara Patnaik
Uttam Mohanty
 Pintu Nanda
Munna Khan

Soundtrack 
 Megha Malhara 
 Bandhu Nuhe Mu Badhu (title song) 
 Aee Ghara Sri Mandira
 Sathire Sathire Khojuchi
 Muna To Chora Prema

References

2010s Odia-language films